Ottavio Bianchi (born 6 October 1943) is an Italian former football player and coach who played as a midfielder.

Bianchi was born in Brescia. During his playing days, he has won two caps for Italy, and played for a number of teams, including Brescia, Napoli, Atalanta, Milan and Cagliari.

He is best remembered for being the coach of Napoli from 1985 to 1989, a team consisting of great players such as Diego Maradona and Careca, which won its first of two Serie A titles in the 1986–87 season. He also led the team to the Coppa Italia title in 1987, and the UEFA Cup title in 1989.

Other teams he has coached include Como, Atalanta, Roma, Inter and Fiorentina.

Club career
Bianchi initially played for the Brescia youth system, and then made his debut with his boyhood team's senior side in the Serie A in 1965. In 1966, Bianchi was transferred to Napoli, the club with whom he played for five consecutive championships. In addition to these, Bianchi had stints with Atalanta, Milan and Cagliari and finished his playing career with SPAL.

International career
Bianchi has also made two appearances for the Italy national football team, where he made his debut on 1 November 1966, in a friendly match against the USSR in Milan, where the hosts won 1–0.

Coaching career
Bianchi began his coaching career at lower division clubs such as Siena, Mantova, Triestina and Atalanta, where he won the Serie C1 championship in 1981–82 with the latter.

Following the good results during his stint with Atalanta, Avellino approached Bianchi to guide them for the 1983–84 season where they finished the season with an 11th place in the Serie A, and then the following season Bianchi moved to newly promoted Como where he managed to reach a mid-table position. The following season, Bianchi joined Maradona's Napoli, who won his first Scudetto in 1986–87. With Bianchi on the bench Napoli won the Coppa Italia in 1987, and the UEFA Cup in 1989.

After four successful seasons with Napoli, Bianchi moved to Roma, where he once again won the Coppa Italia in 1991, and also managed to reach the UEFA Cup final, where the club finished as runners up to Inter.

After the adventure with the giallorossi, where in November 1992, Bianchi replaced Claudio Ranieri to take over the helm of Napoli, managing to transform a relegation-threatened team for a team challenging for an UEFA Cup place. The next year Bianchi was appointed as a technical director, guiding Marcello Lippi after the team lost several important players such as Gianfranco Zola, Careca and Giovanni Galli due to financial difficulties.

The following season he was a coach again, this time at Inter. The first season was a successful one with the victory over their rivals in the Derby della Madonnina being the highlight of the season. But a year later, despite the arrival of Javier Zanetti and Roberto Carlos, the team struggled to maintain the good form where he was given the sack by Massimo Moratti after the team lost to his ex-club Napoli at Stadio San Paolo.

Seven years later, Bianchi was called to save relegation troubled Fiorentina in 2002 without success both as a coach and as chairman of club, succeeding outgoing Ugo Poggi until the end of the season.

Honours

Manager
Atalanta
 Serie C1: 1981–82

Napoli
 Serie A: 1986–87
 Coppa Italia: 1986–87
 UEFA Cup: 1988–89

Roma
 Coppa Italia: 1990–91

Individual
 European Coach of the Season: 1988–89

Personal life 
In May 2020, Bianchi and his daughter Camilla Bianchi released his autobiography titled "Sopra il vulcano" (over the vulcano).

See also
 List of UEFA Cup winning managers

References

1943 births
Living people
Footballers from Brescia
Italian footballers
Italy international footballers
Association football midfielders
Brescia Calcio players
S.S.C. Napoli players
Atalanta B.C. players
A.C. Milan players
Cagliari Calcio players
Serie A players
Serie B players
Italian football managers
Como 1907 managers
Atalanta B.C. managers
S.S.C. Napoli managers
A.S. Roma managers
Inter Milan managers
ACF Fiorentina managers
Serie A managers
UEFA Cup winning managers